Kareh Dan (also Romanized as Kareh Dān; also known as Kahardān and Kahredān) is a village in Padena-ye Olya Rural District, Padena District, Semirom County, Isfahan Province, Iran. At the 2006 census, its population was 384, in 90 families.

References 

Populated places in Semirom County